George Wood Wingate (July 1, 1840 – March 22, 1928) was an American lawyer and organizer of rifle practice.  During the Civil War he served in a New York regiment,  and later supervised the construction of elevated railways in Brooklyn.  In 1867 Wingate drew up rules for systematic rifle practice by Company A, 22d regiment, New York National Guard, of which he was then captain. The publication of these rules (the first of the kind to be formulated in the United States) led to the organization (in 1871) of the National Rifle Association of America, of which he was first secretary and later president from 1886 to 1900.  Besides special articles on military subjects he published:  
Manual for Rifle Practice (1872; seventh edition, 1880)  
The Great Cholera Riots (1880)  
Through the Yellowstone Park on Horseback (1886)  
History of the 22d Regiment, N. G. N. Y. (1896)

Foundation
The Public Schools Athletic League, commonly referred to as the PSAL, was first formed in 1903 as an organization supported by money provided by the private sector under a group of people called the PSAL Wingate Fund. General George W. Wingate was its first presidents and leader. He would go on to serve for over 25 years. Today, the PSAL is funded by the New York City Board of Education. However, as recently as 2003, The PSAL Wingate Fund continued its traditions of honoring former and present PSAL athletes.

Honors
George W. Wingate High School, a public high school in the Crown Heights neighborhood of Brooklyn, New York, now closed, was named for Wingate.  The campus is now home to several schools in the New York City Public School system.  The campus's sports teams are known as the 'Generals', for Wingate's rank in the New York National Guard. The General GW Wingate Athletic Field in the Midwood neighborhood of Brooklyn is named for him.  The naming was in recognition of Wingate's role in founding, and long service as the first President of the Public Schools Athletic League.

References
Notes

Sources

External links

 
 

1840 births
1928 deaths
Union Army soldiers
American military writers
New York (state) lawyers
Lawyers from New York City
United States Army officers
Presidents of the National Rifle Association
Activists from New York City
Military personnel from New York City
19th-century American lawyers